Chris L Jenkins (born March 2, 1971) is an American independent filmmaker and journalist. He is best known for his award-winning documentary Trapped: Cash Bail in America, Rikers: Innocence Lost, BrotherSpeak, and MEN: The Dreamer.

Early life and education 
Jenkins graduated from Oberlin College, where he pursued a bachelor's degree in History in 1993. After that, he served as director of a foster care program in the Bronx, New York, and also worked as a social justice activist in Harlem.

In 1998, Jenkins pursued a master's degree program in Journalism at the University of California, Berkeley. Jenkins also received a master's in Specialized Journalism from the University of Southern California in 2010.

Filmography

Awards
 2013- First Place in Business Reporting, MDDC Press Association
 2008- Pulitzer Prize for Breaking News as one of The Washington Post Staff
 2014- Best Digital Storytelling award by National Association of Black Journalist
 Diversity in Storytelling Award at SeriesFest Film Festival

Personal life 
Jenkins married Sara Collins in 2019. She is an interventional cardiologist.

References 

Living people
1971 births
Place of birth missing (living people)
American male journalists
American documentary filmmakers